Field hockey competitions at the 2023 Pan American Games in Santiago, Chile is scheduled to be held from 25 October to 4 November 2023. It will be the fifteenth edition of the field hockey event at the Pan American Games. A total of eight men's and eight women's teams (each consisting up to 16 athletes each) will compete in each tournament. The games will be played at the Field Hockey Training Center, located in the National Stadium Park cluster in Santiago.

The winner of each tournament will qualify for the 2024 Summer Olympics in Paris, France.

Qualification
A total of eight men's and women's teams will qualify for the tournament. The hosts country Chile received automatic qualification in both tournaments. The top two teams at the 2023 Central American and Caribbean Games and 2022 South American Games also qualified. The top three teams not yet qualified from the 2022 Men's and Women's Pan American Cup (after the results from the above two tournaments are taken into account) also qualified. If the Canada and/or the United States have not qualified still, a playoff between the nations and the third ranked at the Pan American Cups will take place. If both nations do qualify, the playoff will be not necessary and the next best placed team at each Pan American Cup (that has not already qualified) will qualify.

Men's qualification

Chile finished in the top two at the 2022 South American Games, meaning an additional team qualified through the 2022 Pan American Cup.
Since Canada and the USA qualified through the Pan American Cup, an additional spot was available through the event.

Women's qualification

Chile finished in the top two at the 2022 South American Games, meaning an additional team qualified through the 2022 Pan American Cup.
Since Canada and the USA qualified through the Pan American Cup, an additional spot was available through the event.

Medal summary

Medalists

References

Events at the 2023 Pan American Games
2023 Pan American Games
Pan American Games
2023 Pan American Games
Pan American Games